Hydrocortisone aceponate is a veterinary corticosteroid that is used in form of creams for the treatment of various dermatoses (skin conditions). It is an ester of hydrocortisone (cortisol) with acetic acid and propionic acid.

Medical Uses 
Hydrocortisone aceponate is typically used for skin conditions in veterinary practices for dogs. In this instance, it can be used on acute otitis externa, a bacterial infection causing inflammation of the ear canal, as well as a treatment for itchy skin caused by allergies. Additionally, hydrocortisone aceponate can be used to treat hormonal disorders and immune and allergic disorders. The main use for hydrocortisone aceponate is for atopic skin conditions and acute ear infections. It is shown to help with skin lesions and inflammation that respond to corticosteroids but may have been resistant to other treatments. There have been many double-blind tests to see if the benefit-risk ratio is high enough to be useful. It has been approved for veterinary use in Europe for these uses.

Cortavance 
Cortavance is the trade name for a veterinary drug used to treat inflamed, itchy skin, typically caused by allergies. Additionally, a small study showed that the drug could be used to treat atopic dermatitis, with the results showing improvements in lesions and dryness. The only active ingredient in Cortavance is hydrocortisone aceponate, which acts to reduce inflammation. Since this is the only active ingredient, Cortavance can be used to study the pharmacological effects and benefits of hydrocortisone aceponate.

Easotic 
Easotic is the trade name for a veterinary drug used to treat acute ear infections in dogs. The drug is composed of three active substances: hydrocortisone aceponate, miconazole nitrate and gentamicin. These are used in conjunction with hydrocortisone aceponate acts as an anti-inflammatory agent, miconazole nitrate has antifungal properties, and gentamicin is an antibiotic. The drug is used through ear drops and works to kill the foreign agent, prevent further spread, and mitigate symptoms.

Adverse Effects  

 Inhibition of bone formation
 Suppression of calcium absorption
 Delayed wound healing
 Redness on skin

Chemistry 
Hydrocortisone aceponate is a steroid which takes the form of a diester. Because of this special formation, it is effective at low doses and can be used to treat skin conditions. The diester increases transmission of the medicine through the skin and also increases the time that it remains in the affected area. Diesters have been proven to respond quicker and more effectively than non-steroid-based anti-inflammatory creams.

References 

Corticosteroid esters
Corticosteroids
Propionate esters
Acetate esters